The action of March 1677, also known as the Battle of Tobago, took place on 3 March 1677 between a Dutch fleet under the command of Jacob Binckes and a French squadron commanded by Jean II d'Estrées attempting to recapture the island of Tobago in the West Indies. There was much death and destruction on both sides. One of the Dutch supply ships caught fire and exploded; the fire then quickly spread in the narrow bay causing several warships, among them the French flagship Glorieux, to catch fire and explode in turn which resulted in great loss of life. The French fleet retreated but would make a second attempt to captured Tobago at the end of the year with a much stronger fleet.

Order of battle

France
Glorieux (flagship, 64 guns) - (Jean, Comte d'Estrées) Destroyed; 60 killed
L'Intrépide (56 guns) - (Louis de Gabaret) Captured
Le Precieux (54 guns) - Captured
Le Marquis (46 guns) - (Chevalier de Lézines) Destroyed
Le Galant (46 guns) - Damaged
Le Fendant (54 guns) - (Charles de Courbon de Blénac) Damaged
Fortuné (52 guns) - (Nicholas Lefèvre de Méricourt)
Le Laurier (40 guns) - (Charles-François de Machault de Belmont)
Le Soleil d'Afrique (40 guns) - Captain killed

Dutch Republic
Beschermer (flagship, 54 guns) - (Jacob Binckes) 50 killed
Huis te Kruiningen (58 guns) - (Roemer Vlacq) Captured; 56 killed
Zeelandia (34 guns) - (Pieter Constant) 44 killed
Middelburg (38 guns) - (Jan Swart) Destroyed
Sphaera Mundi (41 guns) 
Gouden Ster (30 guns) - (Pieter Cooreman) Captain killed
Hertog van York (26 guns) - (Frederick Sweers) 
Alcion (24 guns) - (Cornelis Stolwijk) Sunk
Popkensburg (24 guns) - (Pieter Slolwyck)  
Sint Salvador (6 guns) 

Conflicts in 1677
1677
1677 in the Caribbean
Tobago
History of Trinidad and Tobago